William Kwai Sun Chow (July 3, 1914 – September 21, 1987, AKA William Ah Sun Chow Hoon) was instrumental in the development of the martial arts in the United States, specifically the family of styles referred to as kenpo/kempo.

Born in Honolulu, Hawaii Chow was the third of sixteen children and the first son born to Sun Chow Hoon (AKA Ah Hoon Chow) and Rose Kalamalio Naehu. Chow's father came to Hawaii at the age of 19 and worked in a laundromat as a laborer. His mother was of Hawaiian descent. One of his brothers, John Chow-Hoon, would also become a well–known martial artist. Chow left school at age eleven when he was in the sixth grade.

Training and lineage
Chow studied several types of martial arts as a young man. These styles most likely included: boxing, wrestling, jujutsu, and karate. Though he stood no more than 5’2” tall, he was well known for his powerful breaking techniques. Chow eventually studied “Kenpo Jiujutsu” or “Kosho Ryu Kenpo” under the direction of James Mitose.  As he progressed he often tested his prowess against US military personnel in street fights. In spite of this, it was never recorded that Chow ran afoul of the law. 

William Chow became one of five people awarded black belts under Mitose. Chow's black belt certificate was signed by Thomas Young. Young was Mitose's senior student and instructor.

Instruction style
Chow had a reputation for being a tough instructor, although this quote from Nick Cerio seems to indicate that the intent was to train, not to harm:
I got banged here and there with the old man, but not in a malicious way, Chow was tough and gave you a good strong workout.  He was adamant about physical conditioning and when he did a technique, he meant business.  I believe he didn’t have the intention of hurting you.  It was just that he was so powerful and quick that he didn’t realize himself how much damage he did when he demonstrated a technique on you.

Influence

Kenpo Karate
In 1944 Chow began teaching what he called “Kenpo Karate” at the Nuuanu YMCA in Honolulu. As Mitose had referred to his art as "kenpo jujitsu," rather than "kenpo karate," this was a departure for Chow. His many students included Edmund Parker, Joseph D. and Adriano D. Emperado, Ron Alo, Abe KAMAHOAHOA, Bobby Lowe, Ralph Castro, Sam Kuoha, Matias Ulangca Jr, Bill Chun Sr., John Leone, William G. (Billy) Marciarelli (Kachi/Kenpo), Walter Liu, and Paul Pung. He did not create or perform any kata but focused more on individual techniques.

Spread of Kenpo Karate
William Chow's legacy grew as kenpo spread to the United States mainland with its introduction by Edmund Parker and other students of Chow such as Ralph Castro (Shaolin Kenpo), Adriano Emperado (Kajukenbo, Karazenpo go shinjutsu) and later from Sonny Gascon, his student George Pesare, who founded the East Coast branch of Karazenpo/Kempo, and his student Nick Cerio, who were instrumental in bringing kenpo to students in the eastern United States. Additional students such as George Pesare and Ron Alo who was one of the first practitioners to bring Kara-Ho Kempo to the mainland, where he taught Chow's art in Southern California before developing his own Alo Kenpo system.

Warrior ethos
In spite of his heavy influence on the martial arts in the United States and his many notable students, Chow never had a dojo of his own, often teaching in the park and is thought to have lived in near poverty much of the time. Cerio once stated, "He was a very cautious individual who had no business sense whatsoever." Chow referred to his style as an “War Art” and focused largely on techniques that he felt worked in the streets.

Death
Shortly before his death in 1987, Chow renamed his system Kara-Ho Kempo. Chow died of a cardio-ventricular accident due to hypertension.

References

Sources
Corcoran, John, Emil Farkas, Martial Arts Traditions, History, People, W.H. Smith, 1981. LCCN 82-11940
Breen, Andrew.  "Professor Nick Cerio, Evolution Of A Kenpo Master" Inside Kung Fu, July 1997: 40-45, 102-103

External links
John Chow-Hoon (William Chow's brother)
 Karaho kenpo official website

See also
American Kenpo

1914 births
1987 deaths
Sportspeople from Honolulu
American male karateka
American Kenpo practitioners
American jujutsuka
Martial arts school founders
Hawaii people of Chinese descent